Bear Creek is a tributary of the Tahltan River in northwest part of the province of British Columbia, Canada.

Bear Creek's watershed's land cover is classified as 35.9% shrubland, 19.1% conifer forest, 16.5% herbaceous, 13.9% mixed forest, 13.3% barren, and small amounts of other cover.

Bear Creek is in the traditional territory of the Tahltan people.

Geography
The creek flows south through Level Mountain's high and relatively barren lava plateau. After about  Bear Creek enters a steep canyon carved into the escarpment on Level Mountain's southern edge. Shortly after this the creek is joined by several significant but unnamed tributaries that also flow south from Level Mountain's high lava plateau. These tributaries have also carved steep gorges into Level Mountain's southern escarpment. Below the escarpment the landscape is dominated by coniferous forests. Bear Creek continues south, collecting several more unnamed tributaries, until it reaches the Tahltan River about a kilometre east of the Little Tahltan confluence and the Indian reserve of "Tahltan Forks 5" of the Tahltan First Nation.

See also
List of British Columbia rivers

References

External links
 

Cassiar Land District
Level Mountain
Nahlin Plateau
Rivers of British Columbia
Stikine Country
Tahltan